Seconda Divisione 1923–24 was the lower championship of the Lega Nord.

Differently from the higher championship, it was structured on six local groups.

Regulations 
Six group of eight clubs, fourteen matchdays. Finals with six clubs, ten matchdays.

Two teams promoted to First Division. Two other clubs to test-matches.

Two relegations for each group and a test-matches for the six placed teams against best Third Division clubs.

Group A 
Derthona 18
Biellese 14
Pro Patria 14
Valenzana 13
Vercellesi Erranti 12
Pastore 12
Varesina 0
US Torinese (disqualified)

Varesina and US Torinese relegated. US Torinese then went bankrupt. Pastore lost test-match against Veloci Embriaci and relegated.

Group B 
Sestese 21
Rivarolese 20
Savona 17
Vado 17
Speranza 15
Veloci Embriaci 10
Spes Genova 7
Quarto 0

Spes Genova and Quarto relegated. Veloci Embriaci lost test-match against Pro Gorizia and relegated.

Group C 
Juve Italia 20
Como 19
Atalanta 16
Monza 15
Esperia 14
US Milanese 11
Saronno 11
Pavia 6

Saronno and Pavia relegated. Pavia then took a year-break for a financial crisis.

Group D 
Mantova 22
Fanfulla 18
Piacenza 16
Trevigliese 14
Carpi 13
Bentegodi 12
Ostiglia 10
Legnaghese 5

Ostiglia and Legnaghese relegated. Legnaghese then went bankrupt. Bentegodi lost test-match against Triestina and relegated.

Group E 
Olympia Fiume 18
Dolo 17
Venezia 17
Udinese 13
Petrarca 12
Treviso 12
Monfalconese 11
Edera Pola 0

Edera Pola relegated for bribery. Treviso lost test-match against Monfalconese, which received a wild card as a team of the newly-Italian Julian March, and relegated.

Group F 
Reggiana 22
Parma 20
Viareggio 18
Lucchese 14
Libertas 13
Prato 13
CS Firenze 6
Siena 4

CS Firenze and Siena relegated. Prato lost test-match against US Milanese and relegated.

Final group 
Derthona 13
Reggiana 11
Olympia Fiume 11
Sestrese 10
Juve Italia 9
Mantova 6

Derthona and Reggiana promoted. Later Mantova also promoted as compensation after a match-fixing scandal.

References 

1923–24 in Italian football leagues
Serie B seasons